Balaenifrons is a genus of moths of the family Crambidae.

Species
Balaenifrons homopteridia Hampson, 1896
Balaenifrons ochrochroa Hampson, 1917

Former species
Balaenifrons aryrostrota Hampson, 1917

References

Odontiinae
Crambidae genera
Taxa named by George Hampson